Nikolai Terent'yevich Shamalov, Nikolai Terent'evich Shamalov or Nikolai Terentievich Shamalov (born 24 January 1950) is a Belarusian-born Russian dentist, businessman, and a founding member of Ozero. He is a close confidante of Russian leader Vladimir Putin. Shamalov grew rich after obtaining a stake in Bank Rossiya.

Education
Shamalov is a dentist/physician by training.  He is fluent in German.

Career
Until the 1990s, Shamalov worked as a dentist in Leningrad (Saint Petersburg). In 1994, he founded the company Masterdentservis in Leningrad.

Shamalov was a representative of Siemens in St. Petersburg from 1992 to 2008 selling medical equipment for Siemens Medical Systems. According to Sergei Kolesnikov, Shamalov refused to answer questions by Siemens internal investigators about money laundering, corruption, and bribery. This led to Shamalov's dismissal from Siemens.

From 1993 to 1995, he worked in the Committee on External Relations of the St. Petersburg Mayor's Office. Vladimir Putin was his boss.

In January 1992, AOZT/ZAO Petromed was founded with 51% of its shares owned by the Saint Petersburg's Committee on External Relations (KVS) which Putin headed, 39% of its shares owned by the Center for International Cooperation which is headed by Dmitri Gorelov, and 10% of its shares owned by the Saint Petersburg Committee on Health. Andrey Kolesnikov, a biophysicist from the Polytechnic Institute, formed a cooperative to manufacture medical equipment for Petromed. In 1993, Shamalov was hired by Putin as the Petromed's purchasing agent for Siemens medical equipment from Germany instead of buying from Kolesnikov's cooperative's Russian manufactured equipment. Over many years, Petromed received state funds for the purchase of medical equipment, but Putin also demanded that Russian oligarchs make charitable contributions to Petromed for the purchase of medical equipment. However, Shamalov greatly inflated the purchase price of the medical equipment and then funneled 33% of the money to offshore accounts. After Vladimir Yakovlev, who was the Governor of Saint Petersburg, became a very outspoken critic of Petromed, Putin, and corruption, Gorelev and Kolesnikov bought out the Saint Petersburg Committee on Health portion of Petromed and became the only two owners of Petromed. Later, Gorelov, Kolesnikov, and Shamalov used the funneled money, which they obtained as overcharges to Petromed, to purchase shares in Rossiya Bank, Vyborg Shipyard, and other entities.

On 10 November 1996, he was a founding member of Vladimir Putin's closed gate community, the cooperative Ozero. As of 2016, Shamalov has remained a member of the cooperative Ozero.

In early 1997 and previously, Shamalov's family and the family of Vladimir Putin and Lyudmila Ocheretnaya vacationed together in Davos, Switzerland.

In 2004, he, Yuri Kovalchuk, and Dmitry Vladimirovich Gorelov became co-owners of Bank Rossiya. Shamalov has the second-largest stake in Bank Rossiya.

On 18 October 2005, he, Sergei Kolesnikov, and Gorelov founded Rosinvest. Using money that Shamalov had funneled from Petromed to offshore accounts and money that was from the Russian state treasury, this company built the health resort in Gelendzhik known as "Putin's Palace" which was part of "project south". To finance "Putin's Palace", Shamalov's expertise in selling medical equipment through Siemens in St Petersburg was essential in obtaining several hundreds of millions of dollars out of the $1 billion intended for Russian healthcare improvements. Shamalov is the original legal owner of "Putin's Palace."

In 2006, he became a co-owner with a controlling share (10%) of Vyborg Shipyard. Dmitri Gorelov's son Vasili Gorelov is another owner of Vyborg Shipyard.

In 2010, he, his son Kirill, and Oleg Vitalyevich Sharykin became co-owners of the Russian Cement Company. Nikolai owns a 12.5% share. Kirill owns a 5% share and is on the board of directors. The Shamalov's combined stake is estimated to be 15 billion rubles in 2018.

In 2011, to support the Russian Defense Ministry, Roscosmos, and ROSATOM, he and Oleg Sharykin formed the joint company Ceramic Technologies which has two main projects: (1) the creation of silicon carbide pencil boxes for the long-term storage and disposal of highly radioactive nuclear waste in underground sites and (2) the development and production of silicon carbide optical blocks in telescopes and sensors used in remote sensing surveillance satellites, which also can detect asteroid hazards and explore deep space. Ceramic Technologies is a member of the Lebedev Institute of Physics (FIAN) through the Troitsk Technopark and the Skolkovo Foundation but receives no investment and no funding from either. Also, Sharykin said that we have in Kemerovo "Khimprom" and PO "Tokem", which competes with Lanxess, Dow Chemical, and Mitsubishi Chemical for monodisperse copolymers in resin ion exchangers for nuclear reactors at nuclear power plants, nuclear-powered ships (both icebreakers and submarines), and water treatment in the chemical and metallurgical industries. As of October 2015, ROSATOM purchases 40% of its needs for resin ion exchangers from NATO countries, but the Kemerovo production sites are expected to meet 100% of ROSATOM needs by 2017.

Between 2010 and 2016 with support from Bank Rossiya, he became the beneficial owner of land in Karelia near Ladoga in the Lakhdenpokhsky District.

On 28 June 2013, he was the second-largest shareholder in Bank Rossiya owning around 10.5% of the total shares.

According to the Panama Papers, his Bank Rossiya staff in St Petersburg sent all their confidential instructions through a firm of Swiss attorneys in Zurich, Dietrich Baumgartner and Partners, to have Mossack Fonseca (Mossfon) establish a British Virgin Islands shell company, Sandalwood Continental Ltd, to hide large sums of Vladimir Putin's personal wealth that had been in bank accounts at the Russian Commercial Bank (RCB) of Cyprus, which is a bank owned by VTB and is now known as RCB Bank. Some of this money was transferred from Sergei Roldugin's Sandalwood Continental Ltd to Ozon LLC to purchase and develop the Igora ski resort.

According to Sergei Kolesnikov, Shamalov gives Vladimir Putin updates on the status of Putin's offshore wealth and hidden accounts usually two or three times a year.

As of 2018, his relationships with various entities and individuals and be found in this image.

As of January 2019, Shamalov and Yuri Kovalchuk through their ownership of Rossiya Bank have become the most important investors in Russia's development of its illegal annexation of Crimea during the ongoing Russo-Ukrainian War.

His nickname is Professor Filip Filippovich Preobrazhensky or the "Professor of the Transfiguration," who was the central character that transforms from a stray dog into a New Soviet man in Mikhail Bulgakov’s Heart of a Dog.

Personal wealth
In 2011, he was listed as the 198th richest Russian with a wealth of $500 million by Forbes.

He is on the billionaires (rubles) group with Delovoy Peterburg.

Sanctions
Because of the ongoing Russian interference in Ukraine and Shamalov's close personal relationship's with Vladimir Putin, Shamalov has been under sanctions by the European Union since 30 July 2014, Liechtenstein since 31 July 2014, Canada since 2 August 2014, Switzerland since 27 August 2014, Australia since 2 September 2014, and Ukraine, since 17 October 2016. These sanctions both freeze his assets in the European Union, Liechtenstein, Switzerland, Ukraine, Canada, and Australia, and also restrict his travel rights.

Personal life
Shamalov has two sons.

Yuri Shamalov
Yuri Shamalov (born 10 June 1970 in Saint Petersburg) worked under Vladimir Putin and with Yuri's father Nikolai on the foreign economic relations committee (KVS) for the city of Saint Petersburg from October 1993 to October 1995. He was a Siemens sales representative for Moscow from February 1997 to July 2003. He was the first vice president for Gazfond from July to August 2003. He was the Chairman of the Supervisory Board of Gazprom-Media from July 2008 to June 2012, the Chairman of the Supervisory Board of OJSC Gaz-Service from November 2008 to February 2015, the Chairman of the Supervisory Board of OAO Gazkon from November 2008 to February 2015, the Chairman of the Supervisory Board of PJSC Gaz-Tek from October 2011 to February 2015, and the Deputy Chairman of the Supervisory Board OJSC Gazprombank from June 2008 to December 2014. He is currently the Deputy chairman on the Supervisory Board of JSC Gazprombank, since December 2014; a board member of Gazprom Media, since August 2008; the Chairman of the Supervisory Board of Gazprombank-Fund, since July 2007; and the President of Gazfond, since August 2003. Since March 2014, through his relationship with Gazfond and its controlling interest in Leader Assets Management, he has the controlling interest at JSC Gazprombank. Since November 2014 and through his chairmanship of Gasfond, he is the majority shareholder of Gazprombank which controls Gazprom-Media.

Yuri Shamalov has degrees from the Higher Naval Engineering College V. I. Lenin in 1992 in naval engineering and from the All-Russian Academy of Foreign Trade of the Ministry of Foreign Economic Relations of the Russian Federation in 1996 in foreign trade.

Kirill Shamalov

Kirill Shamalov (born 22 March 1982 in Saint Petersburg) is a deputy chairman on SIBUR's management board, a vice-president of Sibur Holding, which is a Russian gas processing and petrochemicals company headquartered in Moscow, and was married to Putin's second daughter Katerina Tikhonova from 2013 to 2018. In April 2018, the United States imposed sanctions on his son Kirill Shamalov and 23 other Russian nationals due to the Russian interference in Ukraine and to prevent Vladimir Putin and his close inner circle's next generation of relatives from gaining wealth.

Notes

References

1950 births
Russian dentists
Living people
Businesspeople from Saint Petersburg
Russian individuals subject to European Union sanctions
Belarusian emigrants to Russia
Businesspeople in the health care industry